Nelson Japanese-English Character Dictionary  may refer to:
 The New Nelson Japanese-English Character Dictionary
 The Nelson Japanese-English Character Dictionary